Wasakaka is a savory sauce found in Dominican and Venezuelan cuisine. The name is also spelled guasacaca, pronounced the same. It is often used in chicken dishes.

Variations

Venezuela 
In Venezuela the sauce is made from avocados, olive oil, salt, pepper, lime juice or vinegar, cilantro, parsley, green bell peppers, onions, worcestershire sauce, garlic, and chili peppers. The Venezuelan sauce is similar to Mexican guacamole. 

It is served over parrillas (grilled food), arepas, empanadas, and various other dishes. It is common to make the guasacaca with a little hot sauce instead of jalapeño, but like a guacamole, it is not usually served as a hot sauce itself.

Dominican Republic 
In the Dominican Republic the sauce is made with lime or sour orange juice, garlic, parsley, salt, pepper and olive oil. It is similar to Canary Islands mojo, which was brought to the Caribbean and is very popular in Cuba and Puerto Rico. The sauce in Dominican Republic is boiled with plenty of water until it reduces halfway. The sauce is then used for roasted chicken and boiled cassava.

See also 

 Guacamole
Chimichurri
 Green sauce
Salsa verde

References

External links
Venezuelan Guasacaca Sauce for Arepas on ArepasDelGringo
How to make Guasacaca in 3 minutes on YouTube
Pollo con Wasakaka recipe on Dominican Cooking
Wasakaka sauce recipe on Food & Wine
Patacon de Pernil recipe including Wasakaka sauce recipe

Sauces
Venezuelan cuisine
Dominican Republic cuisine
Avocado dishes
Citrus dishes